Hyponeuma is a monotypic moth genus of the family Erebidae. Its only species, Hyponeuma taltula, is found in the Brazilian states of São Paulo and Paraná. Both the genus and species were first described by William Schaus, the genus in 1906 and the species two years earlier.

References

Herminiinae
Monotypic moth genera